20th Century Masters – The Millennium Collection: The Best of Unwritten Law is a compilation album by the San Diego-based rock band Unwritten Law, released in 2006 by Interscope Records. It combines tracks from their two Interscope albums Unwritten Law and Elva. It was released without the knowledge or consent of the band, who had left the Interscope label in 2003. At the time of its release, the band was preparing their own "greatest hits" album, The Hit List, which was released in January 2007 and included songs spanning their entire career rather than just these two albums.

Reception 
Corey Apar of Allmusic gave the album three stars out of five, questioning why the band was included in the 20th Century Masters series when they were less successful in the 1990s than many of their pop punk and skate punk contemporaries such as Blink-182, Face to Face, and MxPx: "This compilation seems forced and unnecessary," he remarked, "wholly trying to make the band seem much more important than they really are in the grand scheme of rock & roll." He also criticized the release for only including tracks from Unwritten Law's two Interscope albums, Unwritten Law (1998) and Elva (2001), when the band had put out five studio albums by the time of the compilation's release, but remarked that those were the band's two best albums and that Interscope being responsible for 20th Century Masters likely explained the selection. He called the compilation "a solid display of Unwritten Law highlights, but it's pretty much the equivalent of putting both of those records on shuffle and skipping past half-a-dozen tracks along the way. Point being, save your money [...] this collection is little more than a label cash-in."

Track listing

Tracks 1-7 are from Unwritten Law.
Tracks 8-12 are from Elva.

Personnel

Band
Scott Russo – vocals
Steve Morris – lead guitar
Rob Brewer – rhythm guitar
Pat "PK" Kim – bass guitar (tracks 8-12)
Wade Youman – drums, percussion

Additional musicians
Micah Albao – bass guitar (tracks 1-7)
Rick Parashar – piano, keyboards, tambura, percussion (tracks 1-7)
Geoff Turner – DJ (tracks 1-7)
Erik Aho – additional guitar on "Cailin"
Craig Yarnold – additional backing vocals on "Holiday"
Josh Freese – drums on "Up All Night"
Miguel – upbeat guitar on "How You Feel," lead guitar on "Seein' Red"
Marshall Goodman – percussion on "Up All Night"

Production
Tracks 1-7
Rick Parashar – producer, engineer, mix engineer
Jon Plum – assistant producer, engineer, and mixing
Geoff Ott – second engineer
Jon Mathias – engineer of "Holiday"
George Marino – mastering

Tracks 8-12
John Shanks – producer of "Mean Girl" and "Geronimo"
Miguel – producer of "Up All Night", "How You Feel", and "Seein' Red"
Mark DeSisto and Tobias Miller – engineers
Dan Chase, Tal Herzberg, and Baraka – Pro Tools
Eddie Ashworth – additional engineering
Mike McMullen and Jerry Moss – assistant engineers
David J. Holman – mix engineer
Brian Garder – mastering

Artwork
Dean Karr – photography

References 

Unwritten Law compilation albums
Unwritten Law
Albums produced by Rick Parashar
Albums produced by John Shanks
2006 compilation albums
Interscope Records compilation albums
Albums produced by Michael Happoldt